Al wasl development is a mixed-use development in planning stages.

The development when completed will include eight 32-floor apartments, serviced apartments, and a five-star hotel, which will be operated by the prominent chain. One of the residential towers will house a 500-room hotel and will host 500 serviced apartments. Out of eight residential towers, two towers will be for commercial use and the remaining will be residential.

The development also includes the malls, which will cover a total of 240,000 sq ft. The mall is named Zabeel Mall and is expected to be built on an area of 1.5 million sq ft, including two basement floors. The mall upon completion will have a food court, coffee shops, eight restaurants, entertainment centre, eight-screen cinema, entertainment complex, and around 280 retail stores.  The whole development is in planning stages. The Zabeel mall and Royal mall are already under construction.  The duration period of Al Wasl city is 30 months with a total cost of AED 2.1 billion.

See also
List of development projects in Dubai

References
Menareport.com

Proposed buildings and structures in Dubai